88 Aquarii (abbreviated 88 Aqr) is a star in the equatorial constellation of Aquarius. 88 Aquarii is the Flamsteed designation, though it also bears the Bayer designation c2 Aquarii. In dark conditions it is visible to the naked eye with an apparent visual magnitude of +3.68.

The spectrum of 88 Aquarii matches an evolved giant star with a classification of K1 III. The cool, orange hued glow of this star comes from the outer atmosphere's effective temperature of 4,430 K.

References

External links
 Image 88 Aquarii
 Simbad

Aquarii, c2
Aquarii, 088
218594
Aquarius (constellation)
K-type giants
114341
8812
BD-21 6368